SS Varvassi is a wrecked ship just off the Needles lighthouse, which is at the western end of the Isle of Wight.  The ship crashed about 150 meters west of the lighthouse. The Isle of Wight is off the South coast of England, near Southampton.

Varvassi was a 3,875-ton Greek merchant steamship that was wrecked on the Needles rocks in 1947. It was carrying a cargo of tangerines from Algiers to Southampton. The ship became wrecked after an engine failure in stormy weather, and drifted onto the rocks. When an attempt was made to haul the ship off the rocks, she flooded and sank. All 36 crew were rescued unharmed, as was approximately one third of the cargo of tangerines and wine.

There are still remains of the wreck lying just below the surface. Some parts of the wreck can be seen at very low tides. The wreck constitutes a hazard to small craft that attempt to sail too close to the lighthouse.

Any race around the Island have to face the obstacle of the SS Varvassi. Yacht racers see the passage between the crashed SS Varvassi and Goose Rock as a shortcut, many however miscalculate this.

References

External links
 

Shipwrecks in the English Channel
Shipwrecks of the Needles
Wreck diving sites in England
Maritime incidents in 1947
Steamships of Greece
1914 ships